The 2018–19 Washington Capitals season was the 45th season for the National Hockey League franchise that was established on June 11, 1974. It was the first season with new head coach Todd Reirden. They entered the season as the defending Stanley Cup champions. The Capitals clinched a playoff spot on March 28, 2019, after a 3–2 win over the Carolina Hurricanes. On April 4, the team defended their division title in a 2–1 win against the Montreal Canadiens.

The Capitals faced the Carolina Hurricanes in the 2019 Stanley Cup playoffs, where they lost in seven games. With losing the series after taking a 2–0 series lead, this was the eleventh time the Capitals have lost a playoff series after taking a 2–game lead in their franchise history.

Standings

Schedule and results

Preseason
The preseason schedule was published on June 18, 2018.

|- style="background:#fff;"
| 1 || September 16 || @ Boston || 1–2  || 0–0–1
|- style="background:#fcc;"
| 2 || September 18 || Boston || 2–5 || 0–1–1
|- style="background:#fcc;"
| 3 || September 20 || @ Montreal || 2–5 || 0–2–1
|- style="background:#fcc;"
| 4 || September 21 || @ Carolina || 1–5 || 0–3–1
|- style="background:#cfc;"
| 5 || September 25 || @ St. Louis || 4–0 || 1–3–1
|- style="background:#fff;"
| 6 || September 28 || Carolina|| 4–5  || 1–3–2
|- style="background:#cfc;"
| 7 || September 30 || St. Louis|| 5–2 || 2–3–2
|-

Regular season
The regular season schedule was released on June 21, 2018.

|- style="background:#cfc;"
| 1 || October 3 || Boston || 7–0 ||  || Holtby || Capital One Arena || 18,506 || 1–0–0 || 2 || Recap
|- style="background:#fff;"
| 2 || October 4 || @ Pittsburgh || 6–7 || OT || Holtby || PPG Paints Arena || 18,627 || 1–0–1 || 3 || Recap
|- style="background:#cfc;"
| 3 || October 10 || Vegas || 5–2 ||  || Holtby || Capital One Arena || 18,506 || 2–0–1 || 5 || Recap
|- style="background:#fcc;"
| 4 || October 11 || @ New Jersey || 0–6 ||  || Copley || Prudential Center || 16,514 || 2–1–1 || 5 || Recap
|- style="background:#fcc;"
| 5 || October 13 || Toronto || 2–4 ||  || Holtby || Capital One Arena || 18,506 || 2–2–1 || 5 || Recap
|- style="background:#cfc;"
| 6 || October 17 || NY Rangers || 4–3 || OT || Holtby || Capital One Arena || 18,506 || 3–2–1 || 7 || Recap
|- style="background:#fff;"
| 7 || October 19 || Florida || 5–6 || SO || Copley || Capital One Arena || 18,506 || 3–2–2 || 8 || Recap
|- style="background:#cfc;"
| 8 || October 22 || @ Vancouver || 5–2 ||  || Holtby || Rogers Arena || 17,227 || 4–2–2 || 10 || Recap
|- style="background:#fcc;"
| 9 || October 25 || @ Edmonton || 1–4 ||  || Holtby || Rogers Place || 18,347 || 4–3–2 || 10 || Recap
|- style="background:#cfc;"
| 10 || October 27 || @ Calgary || 4–3 || SO || Copley || Scotiabank Saddledome || 17,832 || 5–3–2 || 12 || Recap
|-

|- style="background:#fcc;"
| 11 || November 1 || @ Montreal || 4–6 ||  || Holtby || Bell Centre || 20,279 || 5–4–2 || 12 || Recap
|- style="background:#fff;"
| 12 || November 3 || Dallas || 3–4 || OT || Holtby || Capital One Arena || 18,506 || 5–4–3 || 13 || Recap
|- style="background:#cfc;"
| 13 || November 5 || Edmonton || 4–2 ||  || Copley || Capital One Arena || 18,506 || 6–4–3 || 15 || Recap
|- style="background:#cfc;"
| 14 || November 7 || Pittsburgh || 2–1 ||  || Holtby || Capital One Arena || 18,506 || 7–4–3 || 17 || Recap
|- style="background:#fcc;"
| 15 || November 9 || Columbus || 1–2 ||  || Holtby || Capital One Arena || 18,506 || 7–5–3 || 17 || Recap
|- style="background:#fcc;"
| 16 || November 11 || Arizona || 1–4 ||  || Holtby || Capital One Arena || 18,506 || 7–6–3 || 17 || Recap
|- style="background:#cfc;"
| 17 || November 13 || @ Minnesota || 5–2 ||  || Copley || Xcel Energy Center || 19,101 || 8–6–3 || 19 || Recap
|- style="background:#fcc;"
| 18 || November 14 || @ Winnipeg || 1–3 ||  || Copley || Bell MTS Place || 15,321 || 8–7–3 || 19 || Recap
|- style="background:#cfc;"
| 19 || November 16 || @ Colorado || 3–2 || OT || Copley || Pepsi Center || 18,050 || 9–7–3 || 21 || Recap
|- style="background:#cfc;"
| 20 || November 19 || @ Montreal || 5–4 || OT || Holtby || Bell Centre || 21,911 || 10–7–3 || 23 || Recap
|- style="background:#cfc;"
| 21 || November 21 || Chicago || 4–2 ||  || Holtby || Capital One Arena || 18,506 || 11–7–3 || 25 || Recap
|- style="background:#cfc;"
| 22 || November 23 || Detroit || 3–1 ||  || Holtby || Capital One Arena || 18,506 || 12–7–3 || 27 || Recap
|- style="background:#cfc;"
| 23 || November 24 || @ NY Rangers || 5–3 ||  || Copley || Madison Square Garden || 16,884 || 13–7–3 || 29 || Recap
|- style="background:#cfc;"
| 24 || November 26 || @ NY Islanders || 4–1 ||  || Holtby || Barclays Center || 9,072 || 14–7–3 || 31 || Recap
|- style="background:#cfc;"
| 25 || November 30 || New Jersey || 6–3 ||  || Holtby || Capital One Arena || 18,506 || 15–7–3 || 33 || Recap
|-

|- style="background:#fcc;"
| 26 || December 2 || Anaheim || 5–6 ||  || Holtby || Capital One Arena || 18,506 || 15–8–3 || 33 || Recap
|- style="background:#fcc;"
| 27 || December 4 || @ Vegas || 3–5 ||  || Holtby || T-Mobile Arena || 18,275 || 15–9–3 || 33 || Recap
|- style="background:#cfc;"
| 28 || December 6 || @ Arizona || 4–2 ||  || Copley || Gila River Arena || 11,910 || 16–9–3 || 35 || Recap
|- style="background:#cfc;"
| 29 || December 8 || @ Columbus || 4–0 ||  || Holtby || Nationwide Arena || 18,501 || 17–9–3 || 37 || Recap
|- style="background:#cfc;"
| 30 || December 11 || Detroit || 6–2 ||  || Holtby || Capital One Arena || 18,506 || 18–9–3 || 39 || Recap
|- style="background:#cfc;"
| 31 || December 14 || @ Carolina || 6–5 || SO || Holtby || PNC Arena || 14,446 || 19–9–3 || 41 || Recap
|- style="background:#cfc;"
| 32 || December 15 || Buffalo || 4–3 || SO || Copley || Capital One Arena || 18,506 || 20–9–3 || 43 || Recap
|- style="background:#fcc;"
| 33 || December 19 || Pittsburgh || 1–2 ||  || Holtby || Capital One Arena || 18,506 || 20–10–3 || 43 || Recap
|- style="background:#cfc;"
| 34 || December 21 || Buffalo || 2–1 ||  || Holtby || Capital One Arena || 18,506 || 21–10–3 || 45 || Recap
|- style="background:#cfc;"
| 35 || December 22 || @ Ottawa || 4–0 ||  || Copley || Canadian Tire Centre || 15,605 || 22–10–3 || 47 || Recap
|- style="background:#cfc;"
| 36 || December 27 || Carolina || 3–1 ||  || Holtby || Capital One Arena || 18,506 || 23–10–3 || 49 || Recap
|- style="background:#cfc;"
| 37 || December 29 || @ Ottawa || 3–2 ||  || Copley || Canadian Tire Centre || 16,808 || 24–10–3 || 51 || Recap
|- style="background:#fcc;"
| 38 || December 31 || Nashville || 3–6 ||  || Holtby || Capital One Arena || 18,506 || 24–11–3 || 51 || Recap
|-

|- style="background:#fcc;"
| 39 || January 3 || @ St. Louis || 2–5 ||  || Holtby || Enterprise Center || 17,200 || 24–12–3 || 51 || Recap
|- style="background:#fff;"
| 40 || January 4 || @ Dallas || 1–2 || OT || Copley || American Airlines Center || 18,532 || 24–12–4 || 52 || Recap
|- style="background:#cfc;"
| 41 || January 6 || @ Detroit || 3–2 ||  || Holtby || Little Caesars Arena || 19,515 || 25–12–4 || 54 || Recap
|- style="background:#cfc;"
| 42 || January 8 || Philadelphia || 5–3 ||  || Copley || Capital One Arena || 18,506 || 26–12–4 || 56 || Recap
|- style="background:#cfc;"
| 43 || January 10 || @ Boston || 4–2 ||  || Holtby || TD Garden || 17,565 || 27–12–4 || 58 || Recap
|- style="background:#fff;"
| 44 || January 12 || Columbus || 1–2 || OT || Copley || Capital One Arena || 18,506 || 27–12–5 || 59 || Recap
|- style="background:#fcc;"
| 45 || January 14 || St. Louis || 1–4 ||  || Copley || Capital One Arena || 18,506 || 27–13–5 || 59 || Recap
|- style="background:#fcc;"
| 46 || January 15 || @ Nashville || 2–7 ||  || Copley || Bridgestone Arena || 17,336 || 27–14–5 || 59 || Recap
|- style="background:#fcc;"
| 47 || January 18 || NY Islanders || 0–2 ||  || Holtby || Capital One Arena || 18,506 || 27–15–5 || 59 || Recap
|- style="background:#fcc;"
| 48 || January 20 || @ Chicago || 5–8 ||  || Copley || United Center || 21,316 || 27–16–5 || 59 || Recap
|- style="background:#fff;"
| 49 || January 22 || San Jose || 6–7 || OT || Holtby || Capital One Arena || 18,506 || 27–16–6 || 60 || Recap
|- style="background:#fcc;"
| 50 || January 23 || @ Toronto || 3–6 ||  || Holtby || Scotiabank Arena || 19,148 || 27–17–6 || 60 || Recap
|-

|- style="background:#cfc;"
| 51 || February 1 || Calgary || 4–3 ||  || Holtby || Capital One Arena || 18,506 || 28–17–6 || 62 || Recap
|- style="background:#fcc;"
| 52 || February 3 || Boston || 0–1 ||  || Holtby || Capital One Arena || 18,506 || 28–18–6 || 62 || Recap
|- style="background:#cfc;"
| 53 || February 5 || Vancouver || 3–2 ||  || Holtby || Capital One Arena || 18,506 || 29–18–6 || 64 || Recap
|- style="background:#cfc;"
| 54 || February 7 || Colorado || 4–3 || OT || Copley || Capital One Arena || 18,506 || 30–18–6 || 66 || Recap
|- style="background:#fff;"
| 55 || February 9 || Florida || 4–5 || OT || Holtby || Capital One Arena || 18,506 || 30–18–7 || 67 || Recap
|- style="background:#cfc;"
| 56 || February 11 || Los Angeles || 6–4 ||  || Copley || Capital One Arena || 18,506 || 31–18–7 || 69 || Recap
|- style="background:#fcc;"
| 57 || February 12 || @ Columbus || 0–3 ||  || Holtby || Nationwide Arena || 15,701 || 31–19–7 || 69 || Recap
|- style="background:#cfc;"
| 58 || February 14 || @ San Jose || 5–1 ||  || Holtby || SAP Center || 17,562 || 32–19–7 || 71 || Recap
|- style="background:#fcc;"
| 59 || February 17 || @ Anaheim || 2–5 ||  || Holtby || Honda Center || 17,495 || 32–20–7 || 71 || Recap
|- style="background:#cfc;"
| 60 || February 18 || @ Los Angeles || 3–2 ||  || Copley || Staples Center || 18,230 || 33–20–7 || 73 || Recap
|- style="background:#cfc;"
| 61 || February 21 || @ Toronto || 3–2 ||  || Holtby || Scotiabank Arena || 19,378 || 34–20–7 || 75 || Recap
|- style="background:#fcc;"
| 62 || February 23 || @ Buffalo || 2–5 ||  || Holtby || KeyBank Center || 19,070 || 34–21–7 || 75 || Recap
|- style="background:#cfc;"
| 63 || February 24 || NY Rangers || 6–5 || OT || Copley || Capital One Arena || 18,506 || 35–21–7 || 77 || Recap
|- style="background:#cfc;"
| 64 || February 26 || Ottawa || 7–2 ||  || Holtby || Capital One Arena || 18,506 || 36–21–7 || 79 || Recap
|-

|- style="background:#cfc;"
| 65 || March 1 || @ NY Islanders || 3–1 ||  || Holtby || Nassau Coliseum || 13,971 || 37–21–7 || 81 || Recap
|- style="background:#cfc;"
| 66 || March 3 || @ NY Rangers || 3–2 || SO || Holtby || Madison Square Garden || 17,517 || 38–21–7 || 83 || Recap
|- style="background:#cfc;"
| 67 || March 6 || @ Philadelphia || 5–3 ||  || Holtby || Wells Fargo Center || 19,232 || 39–21–7 || 85 || Recap
|- style="background:#cfc;"
| 68 || March 8 || New Jersey || 3–0 ||  || Holtby || Capital One Arena || 18,506 || 40–21–7 || 87 || Recap
|- style="background:#cfc;"
| 69 || March 10 || Winnipeg || 3–1 ||  || Copley || Capital One Arena || 18,506 || 41–21–7 || 89 || Recap
|- style="background:#fcc;"
| 70 || March 12 || @ Pittsburgh || 3–5 ||  || Holtby || PPG Paints Arena || 18,640 || 41–22–7 || 89 || Recap
|- style="background:#cfc;"
| 71 || March 14 || @ Philadelphia || 5–2 ||  || Holtby || Wells Fargo Center || 19,475 || 42–22–7 || 91 || Recap
|- style="background:#fcc;"
| 72 || March 16 || @ Tampa Bay || 3–6 ||  || Holtby || Amalie Arena || 19,092 || 42–23–7 || 91 || Recap
|- style="background:#cfc;"
| 73 || March 19 || @ New Jersey || 4–1 ||  || Copley || Prudential Center || 14,815 || 43–23–7 || 93 || Recap
|- style="background:#fff;"
| 74 || March 20 || Tampa Bay || 4–5 || OT || Holtby || Capital One Arena || 18,506 || 43–23–8 || 94 || Recap
|- style="background:#fcc;"
| 75 || March 22 || Minnesota || 1–2 ||  || Holtby || Capital One Arena || 18,506 || 43–24–8 || 94 || Recap
|- style="background:#cfc;"
| 76 || March 24 || Philadelphia || 3–1 ||  || Holtby || Capital One Arena || 18,506 || 44–24–8 || 96 || Recap
|- style="background:#cfc;"
| 77 || March 26 || Carolina || 4–1 ||  || Holtby || Capital One Arena || 18,506 || 45–24–8 || 98 || Recap
|- style="background:#cfc;"
| 78 || March 28 || @ Carolina || 3–2 ||  || Holtby || PNC Arena || 14,680 || 46–24–8 || 100 || Recap
|- style="background:#cfc;"
| 79 || March 30 || @ Tampa Bay || 6–3 ||  || Holtby || Amalie Arena || 19,092 || 47–24–8 || 102 || Recap
|-

|- style="background:#fcc;"
| 80 || April 1 || @ Florida || 3–5 ||  || Copley || BB&T Center || 14,376 || 47–25–8 || 102 || Recap
|- style="background:#cfc;"
| 81 || April 4 || Montreal || 2–1 ||  || Holtby || Capital One Arena || 18,506 || 48–25–8 || 104 || Recap
|- style="background:#fcc;"
| 82 || April 6 || NY Islanders || 0–3 ||  || Copley ||  Capital One Arena || 18,506 || 48–26–8 || 104 || Recap
|-

|-
|

Playoffs

The Capitals faced the Carolina Hurricanes in the First Round of the playoffs, and were defeated in seven games.

|- style="background:#cfc;"
| 1 || April 11 || Carolina || 4–2 ||  || Holtby || Capital One Arena || 18,506 || 1–0 || Recap
|- style="background:#cfc;"
| 2 || April 13 || Carolina || 4–3 || OT || Holtby || Capital One Arena || 18,506 || 2–0 || Recap
|- style="background:#fcc;"
| 3 || April 15 || @ Carolina || 0–5 ||  || Holtby || PNC Arena || 18,783 || 2–1 || Recap
|- style="background:#fcc;"
| 4 || April 18 || @ Carolina || 1–2 ||  || Holtby || PNC Arena || 19,202 || 2–2 || Recap
|- style="background:#cfc;"
| 5 || April 20 || Carolina || 6–0 ||  || Holtby || Capital One Arena || 18,506 || 3–2 || Recap
|- style="background:#fcc;"
| 6 || April 22 || @ Carolina || 2–5 ||  || Holtby || PNC Arena || 18,913 || 3–3 || Recap
|- style="background:#fcc;"
| 7 || April 24 || Carolina || 3–4 || 2OT || Holtby || Capital One Arena || 18,506 || 3–4 || Recap
|-

|-
|

Player statistics
As of April 24, 2019

Skaters

Goaltenders

†Denotes player spent time with another team before joining the Capitals. Stats reflect time with the Capitals only.
‡Denotes player was traded mid-season. Stats reflect time with the Capitals only.
Bold/italics denotes franchise record.

Transactions
The Capitals have been involved in the following transactions during the 2018–19 season.

Trades

Free agents

Waivers

Contract terminations

Retirement

Signings

Draft picks

Below are the Washington Capitals' selections at the 2018 NHL Entry Draft, which was held on June 22 and 23, 2018, at the American Airlines Center in Dallas, Texas.

Notes:
 The Florida Panthers' second-round pick went the Washington Capitals as the result of a trade on July 2, 2017, that sent Marcus Johansson to New Jersey in exchange for Toronto's third-round pick in 2018 and this pick.
 The Colorado Avalanche's second-round pick went to the Washington Capitals as the result of a trade on June 22, 2018, that sent Philipp Grubauer and Brooks Orpik to Colorado in exchange for this pick.

References

Washington Capitals seasons
Washington Capitals
Washington Capitals
Washington Capitals